Justo antes de Cristo is a Spanish comedy television series set in Ancient Rome created by  Juan Maidagán and Pepón Montero for Movistar+. Its two seasons were released in 2019 and 2020, respectively.

Premise 
Set in Ancient Rome, the fiction starts in 31 BC. Manio Sempronio Galba's death sentence is commuted by a service in the Roman legion, destined to the hostile and exotic Thrace.

Cast 
  as Manio Sempronio Galba.
  as Agorastocles.
 Cecilia Freire as Valeria.
 César Sarachu as Cneo Valerio Áquila.
 Eduardo Antuña as Antonino.
 Manolo Solo as Gabinio.
  as Domicia.
  as Ática.
 Javier Botet as Silvio.
  as Corbulón.
 Eduardo Antuña as Antonino.
 Fernando Cayo as Cornelio Pisón.

Production 
Created by Juan Maidagán and Pepón Montero, the episodes were directed by Borja Cobeaga and Nacho Vigalondo. The first two seasons were shot at once. The Sierra de Guadarrama and the province of Guadalajara served as outdoor locations in order to represent Thrace. The first season (consisting of 6 episodes with a running time of around 25 minutes) was released on 5 April 2019. The second season (also consisting of 6 episodes of roughly 25 minutes), was released on 13 March 2020.

Awards and nominations 

|-
| align = "center" | 2019 || 7th  || Best Comedy Actor || Julián López ||  || 
|-
|}

References 

Television shows filmed in Spain
2010s Spanish comedy television series
2020s Spanish comedy television series
2019 Spanish television series debuts
2020 Spanish television series endings
Spanish-language television shows
Movistar+ network series
Television series set in ancient history
Fiction set in ancient Rome
Television series set in the 1st century BC